Floris De Tier (born 20 January 1992) is a Belgian professional racing cyclist, who currently rides for UCI ProTeam . He was named in the startlist for the 2017 Vuelta a España.

Major results

2010
 4th Gent–Menen
 8th Ronde van Vlaanderen Juniores
2013
 5th Paris–Tours Espoirs
 9th Grand Prix des Marbriers
2014
 3rd Circuit de Wallonie
 7th Overall Kreiz Breizh Elites
 8th Liège–Bastogne–Liège Espoirs
 8th Grand Prix de la Ville de Lillers
 9th Ronde Van Vlaanderen Beloften
 10th Overall Giro della Valle d'Aosta
2015
 9th Vuelta a Murcia
2016
 6th Overall Tour de Wallonie
2020
 1st  Mountains classification, Vuelta a Andalucía

Grand Tour general classification results timeline

References

External links
 

1992 births
Living people
Belgian male cyclists
Cyclists from East Flanders
People from Gavere